Unfaithfully Yours is a 1948 American screwball black comedy film written and directed by Preston Sturges, and starring Rex Harrison, Linda Darnell, Rudy Vallée and Barbara Lawrence.  The film is about a jealous symphony conductor who imagines three different ways to deal with the supposed infidelity of his beautiful wife—murder, forbearance, and a suicidal game of Russian roulette—during a concert of three inspiring pieces of classical music. At home, his attempts to bring any of his fantasies to life swiftly devolve into farce—underscored with humorous adaptations of the relevant music. In the end, the truth comes out, and love triumphs. Although the film, which was the first of two Sturges made for Twentieth Century-Fox, received mostly positive reviews, it was not successful at the box office.

Plot
Sir Alfred de Carter is a world-famous symphony conductor who returns from a visit to his native England and discovers that his rich and boring brother-in-law, August Henshler, has misunderstood Alfred's casual instruction to watch over his much younger wife Daphne while he was away, having hired a detective named Sweeney to follow her. Alfred is livid, and ineptly attempts to destroy any evidence of the detective's report.

Eventually, despite his efforts, he learns the content of the report directly from Sweeney: while he was gone, his wife was spied late at night going to the hotel room of Alfred's secretary, Anthony Windborn, a man closer in age to her own, where she stayed for thirty-eight minutes.

Distressed by the news, Alfred quarrels with Daphne before proceeding to his concert, where he conducts three distinct pieces of classical music, envisioning revenge scenarios appropriate to each one: a complicated "perfect crime" scenario in which he murders his wife and frames Windborn (to the Overture to Rossini's Semiramide), nobly accepting the situation and giving Daphne a generous check and his blessing (to the Prelude to Wagner's Tannhäuser), and a game of Russian roulette with a blubbering Windborn, that ends in de Carter's suicide (to Tchaikovsky's Francesca da Rimini.)

After the concert, Alfred tries to stage his fantasy of murdering his wife, but is thwarted by his own ineptness, making a mess of their apartment in the process. After Daphne returns home, he realizes that she really loves him, and—without revealing his suspicions—he learns that she is innocent of Sweeney's charges. She had gone to Windborn's room in search of her sister, Barbara, August's wife, who was having an affair with Windborn; she became trapped there when she saw Sweeney spying on the room.  Alfred begs Daphne's forgiveness for his irrational behavior, which she gladly gives, ascribing it to the creative temperament of a great artist.

Cast

Rex Harrison as Sir Alfred de Carter
Linda Darnell as Daphne de Carter
Rudy Vallée as August Henshler
Barbara Lawrence as Barbara Henshler
Kurt Kreuger as Anthony Windborn
Lionel Stander as Hugo Standoff
Edgar Kennedy as Detective Sweeney
Al Bridge as House Detective
Julius Tannen as O'Brien
Torben Meyer as Dr. Schultz
Georgia Caine as Dowager (uncredited)
Robert Greig as Jules, the Valet (uncredited)
Max Wagner as Stage Manager (uncredited)

Music
Each of Alfred's three fantasy revenge scenarios is accompanied by music appropriate for the mood of the particular scene, which is underscored throughout. Rex Harrison is shown rehearsing and directing real musicians from known orchestras.

 Overture to the opera Semiramide by Gioacchino Rossini, about a femme fatale as Alfred envisages his wife to be.
 Overture to the opera Tannhäuser und der Sängerkrieg auf Wartburg by Richard Wagner, about renunciation of carnal love for a higher and more spiritual goal, as Alfred sees himself in that situation.
 The tone poem Francesca da Rimini by Peter Ilyich Tchaikovsky, referring to the infernal destiny awaiting an adulterous wife, such as Dante's character.

Production
Preston Sturges wrote the original screen story for Unfaithfully Yours in 1932 – the idea came to him when a melancholy song on the radio influenced him while working on writing a comic scene.  Sturges shopped the script to Fox, Universal and Paramount who all rejected it during the 1930s.

In 1938, Sturges envisioned Ronald Colman playing de Carter, and later initially wanted Frances Ramsden – who was introduced in Sturges' 1947 film The Sin of Harold Diddlebock – to play Daphne; but by the time casting for the film began, he wanted James Mason for the conductor and Gene Tierney for his wife. Jimmy Conlin, one of Sturges' regular actors, played the role of Daphne's father, but the character was cut before the film was released.

Studio attorneys were worried about the similarity between Sturges' character Sir Alfred de Carter, a famous English conductor, and the real-life famous English conductor Sir Thomas Beecham; they warned Sturges to tone down the parallels, but the similarity was noted in some reviews anyway. (Beecham's grandfather was Thomas Beecham, a chemist who invented Beecham's Pills, a laxative.  It is speculated that Sturges named his character de Carter after Carter's Little Liver Pills.)

Unfaithfully Yours, which had the working titles of "Unfinished Symphony" and "The Symphony Story", went into production on February 18, 1948, and wrapped in mid April of that year.  By 28 June the film had already been sneak-previewed, with a runtime of 127 minutes, but the film's release was delayed to avoid any backlash from the suicide of actress Carole Landis in July.  It was rumored that Landis and Rex Harrison had been having an affair, and that she committed suicide when Harrison refused to get a divorce and marry her.  Harrison discovered Landis' body in her home.

The film premiered in New York City on November 5, 1948, and went into general release on December 10.  The Los Angeles premiere was on December 14.

In February 1949, after the film was released, William D. Shapiro, who claimed to be an independent film producer, sued Fox and Sturges with a claim that the story of the film was plagiarized from an unproduced screen story by Arthur Hoerl, which Shapiro had been intending to produce.  The connection was supposedly composer Werner Heymann, who frequently worked with Sturges and whom Shapiro had interviewed to be the music director on his film.

Reception
While rich with the sharp dialogue that became Sturges' trademark, the film was not a box office success. Critics usually attribute this to the darkness of the subject matter, especially for a comedy.  The idea of a bungling murderer did not sit well with 1948 audiences, and the fact that none of the characters is especially sympathetic certainly did not help.

In 2008, director Quentin Tarantino placed the film at number 8 in his top 11 movies of all time.

Sturges, whose previous film The Sin of Harold Diddlebock had been pulled from distribution shortly after being released, never fully recovered from the lukewarm reception given to Unfaithfully Yours, and many point to it as the movie which effectively ended his career.  Despite this, it is considered today by many critics to be an outstanding film.

Home media
The Criterion Company released a DVD of the film, featuring additional audio commentary by Sturges scholars James Harvey, Diane Jacobs, and Brian Henderson. Sturges's fourth (and last) wife "Sandy" also provides commentary about Sturges and the film.

Remake
Twentieth Century-Fox remade the film in 1984 under the same title, with Dudley Moore, Nastassja Kinski, Armand Assante and Albert Brooks and directed by Howard Zieff. The remake, however, eliminated the theme of three different pieces of music inspiring three different response or revenge scenarios.

References

External links

Unfaithfully Yours: Zeno, Achilles, and Sir Alfred an essay by Jonathan Lethem at the Criterion Collection

1948 films
1940s black comedy films
1948 romantic comedy films
1940s screwball comedy films
American black comedy films
American romantic comedy films
American screwball comedy films
American black-and-white films
Films about classical music and musicians
Films directed by Preston Sturges
20th Century Fox films
Films with screenplays by Preston Sturges
Uxoricide in fiction
1948 drama films
1940s American films